Class S8 is a Diesel multiple unit (DMU) made by Hitachi and Hyundai, operated by Sri Lanka Railways. It was imported to Sri Lanka in 1991 and, according to the website Sri Lanka Railways Info Page, is "the best diesel multiple unit ever imported to Sri Lanka".

History
This was introduced 12 years after the previous S7 DMU was imported. 20 train-sets were ordered in order to strengthen the DMU fleet of SLR.

Operation
Due to high power of the engine, this has a higher acceleration rate and also this DMUs can be used for multiple unit working. Multiple S8 units are used in peak hours. These are mostly used in short distance services. And also majority of services in Kelani Valley Line is carried out by this DMUs. Operation lines are;
 Colombo Fort to Rambukkana via Polgahawela.
 Colombo Fort to Avissawella on Kelani Valley Line.
 Colombo Fort to Puttalam.
 Colombo Fort to Aluthgama on Coast Line.

Passenger accommodation
It has four passenger compartments, including dummy control unit. There are no vestibules between the compartments, giving it better ability to run through sharp curves, such as those on the Kelani Valley Line.

Service
Almost all units are in service, as none have been withdrawn, but the class has faced many accidents.

Incidents
In 1991, a service train and a S8 DMU collided together, and the Dummy Unit of DMU was destroyed.
In 1998 due to a derailment with a Canadian class m2 Montreal  another Dummy Unit of a S8 DMU was destroyed

References

S12
Train-related introductions in 1991